Ollioules is a commune in the Var department in the Provence-Alpes-Côte d'Azur region in southeastern France. It is a western suburb of Toulon.

Population

Notable people 
 Christophe Castaner (born 1966), lawyer and politician
 Josuha Guilavogui (born 1990), footballer
 Adrien Frasse-Sombet (born 1983), classical cellist

Twin towns

Ollioules is twinned with:

  Weiler-Simmerberg, Germany, since 2004-2005
  Alto Reno Terme, Italy since 1987

See also
Communes of the Var department

References

Communes of Var (department)